Noises Off is a 1992 American comedy film directed by Peter Bogdanovich, with a screenplay by Marty Kaplan based on the 1982 play of the same name by Michael Frayn. Its ensemble cast includes Michael Caine, Carol Burnett, Christopher Reeve, John Ritter, Marilu Henner, Nicollette Sheridan, Julie Hagerty and Mark Linn-Baker, as well as featuring the last performance of Denholm Elliott, who died in October that year.

Plot
The film follows the rehearsal and performance of a dreadful farce called Nothing On, a hit British show that is preparing for its American debut in Des Moines, Iowa, with a second-rate, Broadway-bound theatrical troupe under the direction of Lloyd Fellowes. Among the cast members are fading star Dotty Otley, hot-tempered and scatter-brained Garry Lejeune, insecure matinee heartthrob Frederick Dallas, myopic leading lady Brooke Ashton, bubbly Belinda Blair, and alcoholic character actor Selsdon Mowbray. Frantically working behind the scenes are Tim Allgood and Poppy Taylor.

The film opens with the final dress rehearsal before opening night, with an unfinished set and the cast still forgetting lines, missing cues, and mishandling props. Fellowes is reduced to cajoling, yelling at, and pleading with them to get things right. Complicating matters are the personal problems and backstage relationships of the cast and crew, which are simmering under the surface during rehearsal but erupt into the open as the play works its way across the country en route to New York.

After the rehearsal, the film goes on to show two performances of the play, one a matinee in Florida in which the feuding cast are barely able to finish the first act, and another in Cleveland, which quickly degenerates into complete chaos and anarchy as none of the cast are able or willing to perform professionally. However, against all odds, they manage to sort out their personal differences and pull together for the Broadway debut, and the show becomes a massive hit.

Cast

Production
According to original playwright Michael Frayn, he was asked by various British producers to adapt the stage play into a screenplay before the play opened in New York. "I was very eager to do it," he said, "but could not see any way for it to be done. In fact, (Bogdanovich's) movie is virtually the same as the play, with a new bit at the end and at the beginning. He's shot it with great bravura. Whether people will like it or not I don't know, but he's had a pretty good go at it."

Frayn said he suggested the characters be changed to Americans. "It would be easier, I felt, for an American producer to set it up with the American cast, and it would be better if their struggles with British accents and style were part of the action. This policy seems to me to have paid off handsomely—the film is most perfectly cast, with quite superlative comic actors."

Bodganovich originally offered the role played by Carol Burnett to Audrey Hepburn. Annie Potts was meant to be in the film but was in a car accident and had to be replaced by Marilu Henner. Filming began in May 1991.

Bogdanovich said his "intention was to get the audience on a kind of ride and not stop. Somebody once wrote a book about silent films called Spellbound in Darkness. I like that phrase. That's the goal. When movies are at their best, they are spellbinding. They're like a dream. Orson Welles called them 'a ribbon of dreams.' And I think that's very accurate. If you can get everybody on your wavelength or on your dream, it's a wonderful feeling."

Retrospectively, Bogdanovich said, "I purposely kept a lower profile on this picture because I didn't want people writing about me and my career. I didn't want anything to distract from this movie." However, he added that the film was a personal project for him. "Texasville is about certain aspects of my life," he said. "But those characters are really Larry's characters. And I feel empathy and sympathy and interest in them as human beings. But I think I know the people in Noises Off better. They're more people I get along with -- the actors and the characters they play. They are people I've grown up with. I've been in show business since I was 15, and I really like actors. I like show people."

Release
"I liked the film," said Frayn. "I couldn't see for the life of me beforehand how such an inherently theatrical confection could be made to work in the cinema, but I think Bogdanovich has brought it off." However, Frayn was unhappy with the film's happy ending and said the filmmakers insisted that Nothing On had to be a success. "I offered a dozen or so cinematic extrapolations of the final disaster," said Frayn, adding that Bogdanovich "argued forcefully and intelligently back. The play had in effect ended happily in the theater, he suggested, when the real actors came out all smiles for their curtain calls. Then again, in a film the audience empathized much more with the characters. People felt cheated if they didn't know what happened to them as individuals, and it was part of the aesthetic of popular cinema entertainment that things ended well."

Box office
The film was not a box office success, earning less than $1 million in its opening week.

Critical reception
The film received mixed reviews from critics. In his review in The New York Times, Vincent Canby noted, "There are a number of hefty laughs scattered throughout . . . this woozy film adaptation" and added, "Noises Off is a practically perfect stage piece, constructed with such delicacy that any opportunistic adjustment can destroy it, which is what happens here . . . It may not even be Mr. Bogdanovich's fault. He hasn't opened up the play in any foolish way. There are even times when the camera successfully catches the tempo of the lunatic action without being overwhelmed by it. Yet too often the action and the dialogue are so fuzzily understood that the laughs are lost. The film's problem is more basic: the attempt to Americanize a fine English farce about provincial seediness. It can't be done."

Rita Kempley of The Washington Post observed, "The performers all seem to be relishing this sendup, but we're always aware that it is a vehicle better suited to the stage."

In The New Yorker, Michael Sragow said, "Most of the time, Bogdanovich sticks to Frayn's gleefully proscenium-bound play without making it work for the movies. The result is roughly equivalent to the pan and scan TV version of a wide-screen spectacle. Bogdanovich has cast actors you want to see . . . in a production that grows increasingly impossible to watch."

In his review of the video release, Lawrence O'Toole of Entertainment Weekly said, "Nothing is as murderous on a farce as film. Its mechanics can work beautifully from the distance of the stage . . . but the closeness of the home screen points up every flaw in Peter Bogdanovich's futile adaptation: anorectic visuals, bloated acting, broad timing, and often dull direction. The cast members . . . are all game, but it's exhausting watching actors try so hard."

Time Out London says the film "undoubtedly has its moments, but will still disappoint those who laughed themselves silly at the original."

Channel 4 notes, "Frayn's frenetic farce was always going to be a difficult act to pull off on the big screen, but Bogdanovich and an enthusiastic cast do their damnedest to sustain the mayhem and the momentum. Those who remember the original theatrical hit are bound to be disappointed by the lack of immediacy and the occasional sense of artifice, but this is perfectly serviceable."

Siskel & Ebert gave the film two thumbs down.

Noises Off holds a 61% rating on Rotten Tomatoes based on twenty-three reviews.

See also
 1992 in film
 List of American films of 1992

References

External links
 Noises Off at the British Film Institute
 
 
 
 

1992 films
1992 comedy films
Amblin Entertainment films
American comedy films
1990s English-language films
Films about actors
Films about theatre
American films based on plays
Films directed by Peter Bogdanovich
Films produced by Frank Marshall
Films set in Iowa
Films shot in Iowa
Touchstone Pictures films
1990s American films